Devergan-e Olya (also Romanized as Devergān-e ‘Olyā; also known as Daverjān-e Bālā, Devergān-e Bālā, and Devergān-e Pāīn) is a village in Padena-ye Olya Rural District, Padena District, Semirom County, Isfahan Province, Iran. At the 2006 census, its population was 54, in 14 families.

References 

Populated places in Semirom County